Adra is a genus of moths of the family Noctuidae.

Species
Adra argentilinea Walker, 1863
Adra nicobarica Hampson, 1926

References
Natural History Museum Lepidoptera genus database

Calpinae
Noctuoidea genera